The 5th Ryder Cup Matches were held at the Ridgewood Country Club in Paramus, New Jersey, a suburb northwest of New York City in Bergen County. The United States team won the competition by a score of 9–3 points to regain the cup.

The U.S. took a 3–2 lead in the series, all of which were won on home soil. It was the first of seven consecutive wins by the U.S. side, which did not lose again until 1957 in England.

Format
The Ryder Cup is a match play event, with each match worth one point.  From 1927 through 1959, the format consisted of 4 foursome (alternate shot) matches on the first day and 8 singles matches on the second day, for a total of 12 points.  Therefore, 6 points were required to win the Cup.  All matches were played to a maximum of 36 holes.

Teams
Source: 

In February 1935, it was announced that a selection committee of six would choose the Great Britain team for the 1935 Ryder Cup. As in 1933, Henry Cotton would not be considered as he was employed by a Belgium club. In July, the first eight players were selected: Alliss, Burton, Busson, Cox, Jarman, Padgham, Perry and Charles Whitcombe. Whitcombe was chosen as captain. In August the remaining two, Ernest and Reg Whitcombe were selected.

The British team sailed from Southampton on the Empress of Australia for Quebec on September 14 following the conclusion of the News of the World Match Play the previous day. They returned from New York on board Aquitania leaving on October 17.

Saturday's foursome matches

Sunday's singles matches

Individual player records
Each entry refers to the win–loss–half record of the player.

Source:

United States

Great Britain

References

External links

PGA of America: 1935 Ryder Cup

Ryder Cup
Golf in New Jersey
Ryder Cup
Ryder Cup
Ryder Cup
Ryder Cup